The Noble Qur'an  is a translation of the Quran by Muhammad Muhsin Khan and Muhammad Taqi-ud-Din al-Hilali. It is available in many languages and is "widely and freely distributed to hajj pilgrims".  It is published and printed at the King Fahd Complex for the Printing of the Holy Quran, which is said to produce ten million copies of the Quran every year.

The Hilali–Khan, Noble Quran has been given a seal of approval from both the University of Medina and the Saudi Dar al-Ifta. It is also the most widely disseminated Quran in most Islamic bookstores and Sunni mosques throughout the English-speaking world. It is available in Airport musallahs. The Saudi-financed translation is interspersed with commentaries from Tabari, Qurtubi, and Ibn Kathir.

Content
Various Hilali–Khan versions of the Quran contain parenthetical insertions, tafsir/commentaries and appendices.  The Hilali–Khan translation has been criticized for inserting the interpretations of the Wahhabi school directly into the English rendition of the Quran. Many readers will not realise this content does not form part of the original Quran wording.  The translation has been accused of inculcating Muslims and potential Muslims with militant interpretations of Islam through parenthetical comments and additions as teachings of the Quran itself.

Criticism
Dr. Ahmed Farouk Musa, an academician at Monash University, considered the Hilali–Khan translation as being a major cause of extremism and a work of propaganda distributed by Saudi religious authorities with money from its oil-rich government. Similarly, Imad-ad-Dean Ahmad, head of Bethesda's Minaret of Freedom Institute, has claimed that the translation is a Wahhabi rendering of the Quran and is not accepted by Muslims in the US.

A number of academics have also criticized the Hilali–Khan translation on stylistic and linguistic grounds. Dr William S. Peachy, an American professor of English at College of Medicine, King Saud University at Qasseem considered the translation "repulsive" and rejected by anyone outside of Saudi Arabia. Dr. Abdel-Haleem, Arabic Professor at SOAS, London University, noted that he found the Hilali–Khan translation "repelling".

The Director of King Fahd International Centre for Translation, King Saud University, Riyad, Dr. A. Al-Muhandis, expressed his dissatisfaction with the translation's style and language, being too poor and simplistic.

A Hebrew translation of the Hilali–Khan Quran has been said to contain errors.

The Hilali–Khan translation has also been criticised by Western academics;  Robert Crane, Mark Durie, and Khaled Abou El Fadl, Khaleel Mohammed, and Sheila Musaji  have taken the translation to task for supposed Muslim supremacism and bigotry.

However, Dr Fathul Bari Mat Jahaya says the translation does not promote hostility towards other religions, with the references to Jews and Christians intended to distinguish between the beliefs of Muslims and the other two communities.

Comparisons with other translations
The Sahih International translation of Al Fatihah Verse 1:7:

The Hilali–Khan translation of Al Fatihah Verse 1:7:

Khaleel Mohammed says, "What is particularly egregious about this interpolation is that it is followed by an extremely long footnote to justify its hate based on traditions from medieval texts".

The Sahih International translation Al-Baqarah Verse 2:190:

The Hilali–Khan translation, including its parenthetical comments and additions, of Al-Baqarah Verse 2:190:

Sheila Musaji says, "the HK translation seriously distorts the concept of jihad."

The Sahih International translation Al-Ma'idah Verse 5:21:

The Hilali–Khan translation of Al-Ma'idah Verse 5:21:

Khaleel Mohammed says, "This Saudi version twists the verse with modern politics, writing, "O my people! Enter the holy land (Palestine)."

See also
 English translations of the Quran
 List of translations of the Quran
 Quran translations
 Saudi Arabian textbook controversy

References

External links
 NobleQuran.com

English translations of the Quran